Bossiaea lenticularis is a species of flowering plant in the family Fabaceae and is endemic to eastern New South Wales. It is a slender, spreading shrub with mostly circular leaves, and yellow and red flowers.

Description
The standard petal is yellow with red markings, the wings yellow and the keel dark reddish with a paler base.

Taxonomy and naming
Bossiaea lenticularis was first formally described in 1825 by Augustin Pyramus de Candolle in Prodromus Systematis Naturalis Regni Vegetabilis from an unpublished description by Franz Sieber. The specific epithet (lenticularis) means "lens-shaped".

Distribution and habitat
This bossiaea grows in forest, mainly in the Sydney region and as far inland as Lithgow.

References

lenticularis
Flora of New South Wales
Plants described in 1825
Taxa named by Augustin Pyramus de Candolle